Podcast Playlist is a Canadian radio program, which airs weekly on CBC Radio One. Co-hosted by Elamin Abdelmahmoud and the show's producer Lindsay Michael, the program is a documentary series which explores a particular theme in each episode through curated excerpts from online podcasts.

The program debuted in May 2015 as a short-run summer series, and was subsequently extended as part of Radio One's permanent regular season schedule in September. The program was originally cohosted by Michael and Sean Rameswaram, a Canadian radio producer and podcaster currently based in New York City, where he is a producer for Studio 360 and the host of its spinoff podcast Sideshow. Rameswaram was previously heard on CBC Radio as a guest host of Q in early 2015, and was one of the five finalists for the permanent new host of the program before Shad's selection was announced in March.

Rameswaram left the show in November 2015, and was succeeded by Matt Galloway. After Galloway was named host of The Current while Michael was concurrently on maternity leave, the show was hosted for several weeks by Nana aba Duncan, until Abdelmahmoud joined Michael as the new host in September 2020.

References

External links

CBC Radio One programs
2015 radio programme debuts
Canadian talk radio programs